Cannabis in Delaware is illegal for recreational use, though decriminalized for possession of small amounts. Medical use of cannabis is permitted for adult patients with certain serious illnesses.

Medical cannabis (2011)
In May 2011, Governor Jack Markell signed legislation allowing patients 18 and older with "certain serious or debilitating conditions" to use cannabis, and possess up to six ounces. Qualifying conditions include "cancer; Alzheimer's disease; post-traumatic stress disorder; and conditions that cause intractable nausea, severe pain or seizures, among other illnesses." In addition to having a qualifying condition, patients must obtain a card for a $125 fee, and the card must be renewed once a year. Delaware Division of Public Health data on patients who received marijuana cards in 2015 showed that the primary medical conditions being treated for cardholders were pain (36.3%), muscle spasms (21.6%), and cancer (9.3%).

The first medical marijuana clinic in Delaware opened in Wilmington in June 2015. As of that date, some 340 Delaware residents held cards from the Delaware Health and Social Services, allowing them to purchase marijuana in order to treat their medical conditions. However, as of 2016, medical-marijuana cardholders still struggled to obtain the drug, with many being forced to pay very high prices, to buy the drug on the street, or to drive very long distances to obtain the drug.

The medical marijuana legislation provided that all three of the state's counties – New Castle, Kent, and Sussex – must have a Compassion Center by January 1, 2013. However, only a single facility (the Wilmington facility in New Castle County) had opened as of 2016.

Decriminalization (2015)
In June 2015, Governor Markell signed legislation decriminalizing the possession of one ounce or less of marijuana by adults. Possession of marijuana remains a civil infraction that carries a $100 fine. The bill passed along party lines, with no Republican member of the House or Senate voting in support of the bill. Under the legislation, it remains illegal for minors (persons under age 21) to possess cannabis. Additionally, smoking cannabis "in a moving vehicle, in public areas, or outdoors on private property within  of a street, sidewalk or other area accessible to the public" is also a misdemeanor.

The decriminalization bill took effect in December 2015.

Legalization proposals
There have been a few attempts to legalize marijuana in Delaware, starting in 2017 by State Rep. Helene Keeley, but such bills failed to receive the required number of votes in the Delaware legislature. Some Democratic colleagues abstained from the vote, citing concerns over the bill's cost.

The most recent push to legalize Recreational marijuana in Delaware was picked up by State Rep. Ed Osienski, who attempted to get a bill passed during the 2020 general assembly session, but failed due to a lack of votes and because of the COVID-19 pandemic. Osienski reworked the bill to introduce it during the 2021 legislative session. Some of those changes included adding a 'social equity' and microbusiness license, through which Osienski says "they’ll get some additional help with applying and some reduction in fees."

2022 Delaware General Assembly passage 
In May 2022, the Delaware General Assembly formally passed a bill on "cannabis or marijuana legalization implementation". On May 24, 2022, the Governor of Delaware, John Carney, vetoed the bill. On June 7, the Delaware House of Representatives voted to uphold the governor’s veto.

See also 

 Legality of cannabis by U.S. jurisdiction

References